The 2017–18 Loyola Greyhounds women's basketball team represents Loyola University Maryland during the 2017–18 NCAA Division I women's basketball season. The Greyhounds, led by twelfth year head coach Joe Logan, play their home games at Reitz Arena and are members of the Patriot League. They finished the season 9–21, 7–11 in Patriot League play to finish in a tie for sixth place. They lost in the quarterfinals of the Patriot League women's tournament to Navy.

Previous season
They finished the season 11–20, 6–12 in Patriot League play to finish in a tie for seventh place. They advanced to the quarterfinals of the Patriot League women's tournament where they lost to Bucknell.

Roster

Schedule

|-
!colspan=9 style=| Non-conference regular season

|-
!colspan=9 style=| Patriot League regular season

|-
!colspan=9 style=| Patriot League Women's Tournament

See also
 2017–18 Loyola Greyhounds men's basketball team

References

Loyola
Loyola Greyhounds women's basketball seasons